Mantamados is a town and a former municipality on the island of Lesbos, North Aegean, Greece. Since the 2019 local government reform it is part of the municipality of West Lesbos, of which it is a municipal unit. It is located at the northeast corner of the island, and has a land area of 122.435 km². Its population was 2,447 at the 2011 census. The municipal seat was the town of Mantamádos (pop. 941). Its largest other towns are Kápi (544), Kleió (356), and Pelópi (351).

Mantamados is very famous for the monastery of the Archangel Michael of Mantamados, popular among the believers of Greece, on the outskirts of the village. The island is also famous for its cheese (Ladotyri Mytilinis) and for its farms. It was also one of the few places in Greece to have a mayor belonging to the Communist Party of Greece until 2000.

References

External links

 

Populated places in Lesbos